William Octavius Moberly (14 November 1850 – 2 February 1914) was an English sportsman who played first-class cricket for Gloucestershire and represented the England national rugby union team.

Early life and education
Moberly was educated at Rugby School, before going to Balliol College, Oxford. He won a blue for rugby in 1872 and until 1874 played for the university. This included the first ever Varsity Match against Cambridge in 1872, with Moberly captaining Oxford to victory. He also played two first-class cricket matches for Oxford, against the Gentlemen of England in 1870 and 1872.

Rugby career
As a wing-three-quarter, he took part in the second ever rugby international between England and Scotland, in 1872. The match, which took part at The Oval, was won by England. Although at club level he always played three-quarter, he was picked as a fullback for England. He was described as a clever runner, who could "drop with either foot, and was a good shot at goal." At club level, Moberly turned out for the Ravenscourt Park Football Club.

He was appointed as an assistant master at Clifton College in 1874 and began playing for the Clifton Rugby Football Club two years later.

Cricket career
Although his duties at Clifton restricted his appearances in first-class cricket, Moberly began playing with Gloucestershire in 1876 was a member of the teams which were the Champion County that year as well as the next. He was used as a top order batsman but would also fill in as wicket-keeper whenever fellow rugby union international and Clifton teammate James Bush was injured or unavailable.

In a match against Yorkshire in Cheltenham 1876, Moberly scored 103 and his captain W. G. Grace an unbeaten 318 when they put on 261 runs for the fifth wicket. It remains to this day a Gloucestershire fifth wicket partnership record. He finished the season with 245 runs at 40.83, his best year in terms of average but he had his most prolific summer in 1883 when he amassed 351 runs at 29.25. The latter tally included his highest first-class score of 121, which he scored in a win over Somerset at Taunton.

References

External links
Cricinfo: William Moberly
Scrum: William Moberly

1850 births
1914 deaths
Alumni of Balliol College, Oxford
England international rugby union players
English cricketers
English rugby union players
Gloucestershire County RFU players
Gloucestershire cricketers
Oxford University cricketers
Oxford University RFC players
People educated at Rugby School
Rugby union players from West Sussex
Schoolteachers from Sussex
Wicket-keepers
Rugby union three-quarters